A Cliff Walk is a walkway or trail which follows close to the edge or foot of a cliff or headland. Numerous walkways around the world have "Cliff Walk" as part of their names:

Newport Cliff Walk, Rhode Island, United States
Devil's Corner Cliff Walk in Washington State, United States
Diamond Harbour Cliff Walk, South Island, New Zealand
Federation Cliff Walk, Sydney, Australia
Langdon Cliff Walk, Kent, England
Capilano Cliffwalk, North Vancouver, British Columbia, Canada

Cliff Walk may also refer to a 1999 comedy film of that title by Robert Cuccioli.